This is a list of cabinets of Iceland.

List

Kingdom of Iceland (1918–1944)

Republic of Iceland (1944–present)

See also
Government of Iceland

References

Government of Iceland
Cabinets

Iceland